The 1985 24 Hours of Le Mans was the 53rd Grand Prix of Endurance as well as the fourth round of the 1985 World Endurance Championship.  It took place at the Circuit de la Sarthe, France, on 15 and 16 June 1985.

During Thursday's practice, Briton driver Dudley Wood in a John Fitzpatrick entered Porsche 962C tangled with the Swiss driver Jean-Pierre Frey in an Alba AR2 on the Mulsanne Straight at 200 mph (320 km/h). They crashed, and they both went over the barriers and into the trees, similar to John Sheldon's crash the year before. The impact was so hard, it even cracked the Porsche's engine. No one was killed. As a result, neither car started the race.

During qualifying, German driver Hans-Joachim Stuck recorded the fastest ever lap of Le Mans for the time - at an average speed of 156.471 mph (251.815 km/h). His record would be held for 32 years, until Kamui Kobayashi broke it in 2017 in a Toyota TS050 Hybrid, averaging a speed of 156.512 mph (251.882 km/h), on a slower and safer variation of the circuit.

Klaus Ludwig took his third overall win, and his second in a row, in the same 956B chassis, 956B-117, which had won the 1984 race.

6-time winner Jacky Ickx finished his final 24 Hours of Le Mans in 10th place.

Official results

† – #41 failed post-race inspection for being underweight. Finished 24th prior to disqualification.

Statistics
 Pole Position: Hans-Joachim Stuck, #2 Rothmans Porsche - 3:14.80 (156.470 mph/251.815 km/h)
 Fastest Lap: Jochen Mass, #1 Rothmans Porsche - 3:25.10
 Distance: 5088.507 km
 Average Speed: 212.021 km/h

References

 
 

24 Hours of Le Mans races
Le Mans
Le Mans
Le Mans